Ruby Mercer, CM (26 July 1906 – 26 January 1999) was an American-born Canadian writer, broadcaster, soprano and entrepreneur.

Mercer was born in Athens, Ohio, and grew up in Toronto, Ontario, Canada. In 1936, she made her debut as a member of the Metropolitan Opera, portraying Nedda in Pagliacci.

She founded Opera Canada, a periodical for which she served as editor from 1960 to 1990.  She also founded the Canadian Children's Opera Chorus, and served as its first president. She was host of CBC Radio's weekly show Opera Time from 1962 to 1979, as well as its successor Opera In Stereo from 1979 to 1984.

She became a member of the Order of Canada in 1995.

Awards and honours
 BA (Ohio) 1927, B MUS (Cincinnati) 1930, honorary D MUS (Ohio) 1978, honorary LLD (U of T) 1995.
 Walter W. Naumburg Foundation award (1934)
 Canadian Music Council medal (1983)
 Toronto Arts lifetime achievement award (1988)
 Order of Canada (1995)

Writing
 The Tenor of His Time (Toronto, 1976), a biography of Edward Johnson
 The Quilicos - Louis, Gino and Lina (Oakville, Ontario, 1990)
 Articles to EMC, Musical America, and Opera News
 Columns and reviews for Opera Canada

Citations

External links
 Mercer at Encyclopedia of Music in Canada, accessed August 27, 2019
 Interview with Ruby Mercer, November 14, 1991

1906 births
1999 deaths
American emigrants to Canada
Canadian women journalists
Canadian radio personalities
Classical music radio presenters
Journalists from Toronto
People from Athens, Ohio
Writers from Toronto
Musicians from Toronto
Canadian music journalists
Canadian magazine publishers (people)
Canadian women non-fiction writers
Members of the Order of Canada
Women biographers
Canadian women columnists
American women columnists
American women radio presenters
Canadian women radio presenters
Women writers about music
20th-century biographers
20th-century Canadian women opera singers
20th-century Canadian women writers